Moghanak-e Olya (also Romanized as Moghānak-e ‘Olyā and Moghānak ‘Olyā; also known as Moghānak and Moghānak-e Bālā) is a village in Borborud-e Sharqi Rural District, in the Central District of Aligudarz County, Lorestan Province, Iran. At the 2006 census, its population was 114, in 24 families.

References 

Towns and villages in Aligudarz County